Live in Brooklyn is the name of a concert CD released on July 11, 2006, by the rock band Phish with a simultaneous release as their second full concert DVD. Performed on June 17, 2004, at the minor league baseball field KeySpan Park in Brooklyn, New York, it was the opening night of what was promoted as the band's final tour, before their 2004 breakup. The concert was simulcast in movie theatres across America.

The following night, June 18, at the same venue, the band performed again, with a surprise appearance from rapper Jay-Z. This can be heard on Live Phish Downloads: 06.18.04.

In addition to being a CD release, this concert is available as a download in FLAC and MP3 formats at LivePhish.com. Selected songs are also available in MPEG-4 video.

Track listing

Disc One
"A Song I Heard the Ocean Sing" (Anastasio, Marshall) - 6:34
"Dinner and a Movie" (Anastasio, Pollak) - 3:55
"The Curtain With" - (Anastasio, Daubert) - 13:44
"Sample in a Jar" - (Anastasio, Marshall) - 4:57
"The Moma Dance" (Anastasio, Fishman, Gordon, Marshall, McConnell) - 15:01 ->
"Free" (Anastasio, Marshall) - 10:26
"Nothing" (Anastasio, Marshall) - 5:34
"Maze" (Anastasio, Marshall) - 10:22
"Frankenstein" (Winter) - 4:59

Disc Two
"46 Days" (Anastasio) - 17:24 ->
"Possum" (Holdsworth) - 8:16
"The Oh Kee Pa Ceremony" (Anastasio) - 1:47 ->
"Suzy Greenberg" (Anastasio, Pollak) - 18:23 ->
"Axilla I" (Anastasio, Herman, Marshall) - 3:25 ->
"2001" (Deodato) - 8:59 ->
"Birds of a Feather" (Anastasio, Fishman, Gordon, Marshall, McConnell) - 7:05
"Kung" (Fishman) - 3:01

Disc Three
"Mike's Song" (Gordon) - 9:05 ->
"I Am Hydrogen" (Anastasio, Daubert, Marshall) - 2:42 ->
"Weekapaug Groove" (Anastasio, Fishman, Gordon, McConnell) - 12:43
"Divided Sky" (Anastasio) - 15:34

Personnel
Phish
 Trey Anastasio - lead vocals, guitars
 Page McConnell - keyboards, backing vocals
 Mike Gordon - bass guitar, backing vocals, lead vocals on "Possum" and "Mike's Song"
 Jon Fishman - drums, backing vocals, lead vocals on "The Moma Dance"

See also
Phish
Phish discography
Live Phish Series

References

LivePhish.com Downloads
Phish live albums
2006 live albums